The 2011 Vuelta a Murcia was the 27th edition of the Vuelta a Murcia cycle race and was held on 4 March to 6 March 2011. The race started in San Pedro del Pinatar and finished in Murcia. The race was initially won by Alberto Contador, whose result was later made void in favour of Jérôme Coppel.

General classification

References

2011
2011 in road cycling
2011 in Spanish sport